The 2011 Tampere Open (also known as the 2011 Aamulehti Tampere Open for sponsorship purposes) was a professional tennis tournament played on clay courts. It was the 30th edition of the tournament which was part of the 2011 ATP Challenger Tour. It took place in Tampere, Finland between 25 and 31 July 2011.

ATP entrants

Seeds

 1 Rankings are as of July 18, 2011.

Other entrants
The following players received wildcards into the singles main draw:
  Sami Huurinainen
  Henri Kontinen
  Micke Kontinen
  Henrik Sillanpää

The following players received entry from the qualifying draw:
  Daniel Berta
  Pierre-Hugues Herbert
  Gonçalo Pereira
  Nicolas Renavand

The following players received entry as a lucky loser into the singles main draw:
  Robin Olin

Champions

Singles

 Éric Prodon def.  Augustin Gensse, 6–1, 3–6, 6–2

Doubles

 Jonathan Dasnières de Veigy /  David Guez def.  Pierre-Hugues Herbert /  Nicolas Renavand, 5–7, 6–4, [10–5]

External links
Official Website
ITF Search
ATP official site

Tampere Open
Tampere Open